The National Intramural-Recreational Sports Association (NIRSA) is an organization which regulates various sports through the collegiate systems across the United States.  NIRSA serves students who play at the university varsity or club level in athletic sports, but do not participate in the NCAA, NAIA or other sports affiliates.

In addition to providing resources for Campus Recreation Programs through conferences, workshops and symposiums, NIRSA is the host of the National Championship Series events, which offers regional and national extramural tournaments in the sports of Flag Football, Basketball, Soccer and Tennis.

History of NIRSA 
Dr. William Wasson founded NIRSA in 1950 when he presented his study on intramural programs entitled "A Comparative Study of Intramural Programs in Negro Colleges." This led to the formation of the National Intramural Association (NIA), NIRSA's original title.

Core Competencies 
NIRSA has 8 confirmed core competencies: programming, philosophy and theory, personal and professional qualities, legal liabilities and risk management, human resources management, facility management, planning and design, business management, and research and evaluation. The competencies help professionals to attain new skills, and plan, assess, and refine programs.

Professional Development 
NIRSA provides a variety of professional development and educational opportunities for members including their Annual Campus Recreation and Wellness Expo.

References

External links
 

College sports governing bodies in the United States
Education-related professional associations